Hoseynabad-e Yarahmadi (also Romanized as Ḩoseynābād-e Yāraḩmadī) is a village in Nehzatabad Rural District, in the Central District of Rudbar-e Jonubi County, Kerman Province, Iran with an elevation of 400 metres above sea level. At the 2006 census, its population was 14, in 4 families.

References 

Populated places in Rudbar-e Jonubi County